Katia Belabbas (born 1 February 1996) is an Algerian windsurfer who competes in the RS:X class. She competed for Algeria at the 2016 Summer Olympics.

Biography
Belabbas was born on 1 February 1996 in Béjaïa, Algeria.

Competitions
Belabbas was the first woman to represent an African nation in RS:X at the ISAF Sailing World Championships, in which she placed 62nd in 2014. At the time of the race, she had trained in RS:X for only eight months. She won a gold medal in the 2015 RS:X African Championship to qualify herself to the 2016 Summer Olympics. At the Olympics, she placed 26th in the women's RS:X event.  She placed third in the 2019 RS:X African Championship in 2019, losing out on an Olympic qualifying spot to countrywoman Amina Bericchi.

References

External links
 
 
 

1996 births
Living people
Algerian female sailors (sport)
Olympic sailors of Algeria
Sailors at the 2016 Summer Olympics – RS:X
Female windsurfers
Algerian windsurfers
21st-century Algerian women
Mediterranean Games competitors for Algeria
Competitors at the 2022 Mediterranean Games
20th-century Algerian women